Karen Cashman (born December 15, 1971) is an American short track speed skater.  She won a bronze medal in the 3000m Short Track Relay Women at the 1994 Lillehammer Winter Olympics. She then suffered a career ending injury after a bad crash.

References
 Database Olympics

1971 births
Living people
American female short track speed skaters
Short track speed skaters at the 1994 Winter Olympics
Olympic bronze medalists for the United States in short track speed skating
Sportspeople from Quincy, Massachusetts
Place of birth missing (living people)
American female speed skaters
Medalists at the 1994 Winter Olympics
North Quincy High School alumni
21st-century American women